Washington & Jefferson College is a private liberal arts college in Washington, Pennsylvania, which is located in the Pittsburgh metropolitan area. The college traces its origin to three log cabin colleges in Washington County, Pennsylvania established by three frontier clergymen in the 1780s: John McMillan, Thaddeus Dod, and Joseph Smith. These early schools eventually grew into two competing colleges, with Jefferson College in Canonsburg, Pennsylvania being chartered in 1802 and Washington College being chartered in 1806. These two schools merged in 1865 to form Washington & Jefferson College.

As of 2009, Washington & Jefferson College had about 12,000 living alumni. Before the union of the two colleges, Washington College graduated 872 men and Jefferson College graduated 1,936 men.

The alumni association recognizes as alumni all students "who have completed at least one college year as full-time students". These alumni include James G. Blaine, who served in Congress as Speaker of the House, U.S. Senator from Maine, two-time United States Secretary of State and the Republican nominee for the 1884 presidential election. Other graduates have held high federal positions, including United States Secretary of the Treasury Benjamin Bristow and United States Attorney General Henry Stanbery, who successfully defended Andrew Johnson during his impeachment trial. As a U.S. Congressman, Clarence Long was a key figure in directing funds to Operation Cyclone, the CIA's effort to arm the mujahideen in the Soviet–Afghan War. James A. Beaver served as Governor of Pennsylvania and as acting president of the Pennsylvania State University; he is the namesake of Beaver Stadium, the largest sports stadium in the world. William Holmes McGuffey authored the McGuffey Readers, which are among the most popular and influential books in history. Thaddeus Dod's student, Jacob Lindley, was the first president of Ohio University.  Astronaut and test pilot Joseph A. Walker became the first person to enter space twice. Other graduates have gone on to success in professional athletics, including Buddy Jeannette, a member of the Basketball Hall of Fame, and Pete Henry, a member of both the College and Pro Football Hall of Fame. Roger Goodell has served as the Commissioner of the NFL since 2006. Baseball broadcaster Al Helfer was the radio voice of six World Series. Among graduates who entered the medical field, Jonathan Letterman is recognized as the "Father of Battlefield Medicine." William Passavant is recognized as a saint within the Lutheran Church. James McGready, who studied with Joseph Smith and John McMillan was a leading revivalist in the Second Great Awakening. Successful graduates in the business realm include Richard Clark, President and CEO of Merck, and John S. Reed, the former chairman of Citigroup and the New York Stock Exchange.

 A "?" indicates that the year of graduation is unknown.
 A "†" indicates final year attended.
 "Jefferson" indicates attendance at Jefferson College.
 "Washington" indicates attendance at Washington College.

 "Canonsburg" indicates attendance at Canonsburg Academy.
 "McMillan" indicates attendance at John McMillan's log college.
 "Dod" indicates attendance at Thaddeus Dod's log college.
 "Smith" indicates attendance at Joseph Smith's log college.

Academia

Military and aerospace

Law and government

Federal executives

U.S. Senators

Members of Congress

Federal Judges

| 
| align="center" | 
| Judge of the Supreme Court of Washington Territory (1861–1865)
| align="center" | 
|-valign="top"
| 
| align="center" | 
| Judge of the United States District Court for the Southern District of Ohio (1898–1910); U.S. Congressman from Ohio (1885–1891)
| align="center" | 
|-valign="top"
| 
| align="center" | 
|  Judge of the United States District Court for the Western District of Pennsylvania (1914–1932)
| align="center" | 
|-valign="top"
| 
| align="center" | 
| Chief Justice of Arizona Territorial Supreme Court (1870–1874); Chief Justice of Utah Territorial Supreme Court (1863–1868); Associate Justice of the Arizona Territorial Supreme Court (1869–1870)
| align="center" | 
|-valign="top"
| 
| align="center" | 1869
| Judge of the United States District Court for the Western District of Pennsylvania (1908–1914); U.S. Attorney for the Western District of Pennsylvania (1902–1905)
| align="center" | 
|-

State Judges

State Governors

State and local

Business

Arts

Athletics

Medicine

Theology

Other

References
General
 
Specific

External links

 Washington & Jefferson College Alumni Association

Lists of people by university or college in Pennsylvania